The 2023 University of Manchester protest is an ongoing student protest and rent strike at the University of Manchester in England. The protest was a reaction to the living conditions in university accommodation provided by the University of Manchester and the cost of living crisis. The goals of the protesters are for a 30% reduction in rent for halls of residence and 30% of the October payment to be refunded, no rent increases for the next three years, to make 40% of student halls affordable, as per NUS guidelines, and for no disciplinary action to be taken against the protesters.

Protests

Rent strike 
On 19 January 2023, a group of 350 students from the University of Manchester withheld rent until their demands were met. The group stated that over half a million pounds worth of rent has been withheld so far.

The students said issues included rat infestations, leaks, mould, and high rent during the cost of living crisis.

Occupations 
On 8 February 2023, students in the rent strike group announced that they had occupied three University buildings; the Samuel Alexander building, the Engineering building, and the John Owens senior management building which contains the Vice-Chancellor's office, where they barricaded doors to prevent access to the building. Similar to the 2020 protests, where banners and projections with slogans were displayed on Owens Park Tower, banners were hung on the occupied buildings targeting the university and its Vice Chancellor.

On 13 February 2023, the student group also occupied the Simon Building.

The University switched off heating and WiFi in the John Owens building on 15 February 2023, which was being occupied by students at the time. Students demanded that the heating and internet be turned back on, and left the building soon after.

Manchester University sent a memo to staff members on 28 February 2023, stating that they aimed to remove the occupiers and start disciplinary action following the discovery of alleged illegal actions taken by the protesters. The University also started disciplinary action and sent emails to those who would be subject to the action the same day, saying the students broke the University's "Conduct and Discipline" regulations.

Demonstration 
On 1 March 2023, protestors marched from Owens Park to the Whitworth Building arch on Oxford Road. The protest was held in support of the demands of the rent strike and the occupations (£1,500 to every student in cost of living support) and ended with a rally outside the Simon Building.

Referendum 
On 3 March 2023, a petition was published allowing students at the University of Manchester to call for a referendum. The petition passed the 400 signatures required for the referendum to be called. The referendum calls for the Student Union to support the demands of the rent strike and broader cost of living support detailed in the demands of the occupation. Campaigning began on 13 March 2023 and voting will take place from 20-23 March 2023.

Incidents 
On 19 February 2023, the University security team called police to the Simons Building on the University of Manchester campus. Six police vans and cars arrived at the scene and refused to assist security in removing the students. Security also blocked access to and from the building including preventing students from exiting and food deliveries from arriving. The student group claimed the staff made false allegations of being assaulted, whereas the University claims security and support staff were injured. There were also claims that personal property such as towels had been stolen by security, and that food and sanitary products were being blocked from students, but these claims have not been verified. However footage of these incidents has been posted to social media.

On 9 March 2023, strikers received emails from the University of Manchester informing them that they would be fined £25 for the delay in paying rent and threatened students with third-party debt collectors.

On 15 March 2023, the University of Manchester delivered a possession order to the occupiers in the Simon Building. This gave notice to the occupiers that the university had begun the process of repossessing the building to force them to leave, citing health and safety breaches as their justification.

References 

Student protests in England
University of Manchester
2023 in England
2020s in Manchester
2023 protests
University of Manchester halls of residence